Michel de Caso (born 1956) is a visual artist born in Toulouse, France. He is the creator of the painting technique known as Rectoversion (1991). He is also the founder of the artistic movement Contemporary Rectoversion (2002) and of Circle Internet Rectoversion (2004). Major works include massive rectoversion dung piles. De Caso is referenced in the following international guides: Art Price, Guide Mayer, Guide Akoun, Dictionnaire Drouot-Cotation-Larousse.

References 
 Entente cordiale show
 Michel de Caso (Cathares Espace & Patrimoine NUMÉRO 3) November / December 2004
 L’art en trois dimensions : un univers à découvrir, Roselyne Cros (Midi Libre & L’Indépendant) 23 January 2007
 Une expo à voir, Arnaud Massios (La Dépêche du Midi, 7 January 2007)
 Artistes du XV°au XXI° siècle [Michel De Caso] (Art, Editions REGARDS) October 2006
 Michel De Caso, un autre regard, Alain COUDERT (Arts Actualités Magazine) July 2006
 Rectoversion ou la peinture à trois faces de MDC,  Stéphanie PEREZ (L'Indépendant & Midi-Libre) 10 August 2001
 Peintures rectoversées, JMT BREITTMAYER (La République de Seine et Marne) 7 April 1997

External links
About Michel De Caso
Column by Alain Coudert, Art Critic
Original Rectoversion website
Michel De Caso's website
Bio on Entente Cordiale Exhibition (London 2005) website

,

1956 births
Living people
20th-century French painters
20th-century French male artists
French male painters
21st-century French painters
21st-century French male artists